Gaston Mauger (13 March 1878 – 18 October 1954) was a French stage and film actor. He made around forty film appearances, including the 1932 thriller Narcotics.

Selected filmography
 The Queen's Necklace (1929)
 Accused, Stand Up! (1930)
 Departure (1931)
 Narcotics (1932)
 Cognasse (1932)
 The Man with the Hispano (1933)
 Mademoiselle Josette, My Woman (1933)
 The Devil in the Bottle (1935)
 Moutonnet (1936)
 Wells in Flames (1937)
 The Woman Who Dared (1944)
 Not So Stupid (1946)
 Loves of Casanova (1947)

References

Bibliography
 Youngkin, Stephen. The Lost One: A Life of Peter Lorre. University Press of Kentucky, 2005.

External links

1878 births
1954 deaths
French male film actors
20th-century French male actors
People from Eure